"Boulevard of Broken Dreams" is a 1933 hit song with lyrics by Al Dubin and music by Harry Warren. Deane Janis with Hal Kemp's Orchestra recorded the original version on October 31, 1933, in Chicago, which was issued by Brunswick Records. In 1934, a rendition sung by Constance Bennett appeared in the film Moulin Rouge, but was unreleased on record.

Set in Paris, the lyrics include "I walk along the street of sorrow/The Boulevard of Broken Dreams/Where gigolo and gigolette/Can take a kiss without regret/So they forget their broken dreams."

Boulevard of Broken Dreams served as the title tune for a stage musical which played February 11March 9, 2003 at the Coconut Grove Playhouse: featuring a libretto by Joel Kimmel, the play was based on the life of composer Al Dubinplayed by Jordan Bennettand featured a number of Dubin compositions as its score.

The song "Boulevard of Broken Dreams" has been added to the score of the stage musical 42nd Street for its 2017 West End run being performed by Sheena Easton in the character of Dorothy Brock: the Daily Express opined that "Boulevard of Broken Dreams" seemed "out of place" in 42nd Street while stating that Easton sang the song "splendidly".

This piece is a tango.  The harmony utilizes a harmonic minor scale.

Renditions

Ted Weems and His Orchestra recorded the song with vocals by Elmo Tanner on December 5, 1933 in Chicago on the Bluebird label as catalog number 5288.
Jan Garber and His Orchestra recorded the song with vocals by Lee Bennett on December 14, 1933 on the Victor label as catalog number 24498. Their recording remained on the U.S. Billboard chart for 11 weeks and reached number six in 1934.
Ed Lloyd's Rhythm Boys recorded the song with vocals by Helen Ward on February 2, 1934 on Conqueror Records as catalog number 8261.
Bing Crosby sang the song with Jimmie Grier and His Orchestra on April 16, 1934 on his radio show Bing Crosby Entertains (the Woodbury series).
Connee Boswell recorded the song on April 27, 1934 on the Brunswick label for the b-side of the 78rpm single to "Carioca" as catalog numbers 6871 and 01783.
Bert Ambrose and His Orchestra recorded the song with vocals by Sam Browne in 1934 on the Brunswick label as catalog number 01721.
María Teresa Vera composed and sang "Veinte años" in 1935 with the melody of the first two lines taken from "Boulevard of Broken Dreams," and Spanish lyrics by Guillermina Aramburu. This song became a Cuban classic, and was later covered by many other Cuban singers.
Harry Sosnik and His Orchestra recorded the song with vocals by Frances Langford on July 3, 1939 in Los Angeles on the Decca label for the b-side of the 78rpm single to "Moonglow" as catalog number 2861.
The King Cole Trio (featuring Jack Costanzo on bongos) recorded the song July 26, 1949.
"Boulevard of Broken Dreams" is a signature song of Tony Bennett, who was signed by Mitch Miller to Columbia Records on the strength of Bennett's 1949 demo of the song. In his debut Columbia session on 17 April 1950 at CBS 30th Street Studio, Bennett, backed by the Marty Manning orchestra,  recorded "Boulevard of Broken Dreams" to serve as  Bennett's major label debut single release on 27 April 1950. Bennett subsequently recorded the song in 1990, 2006 (as a duet with Sting for Bennett's Duets: An American Classic album) and 2007.
Instrumental versions of this song include the version by jazz piano virtuoso Art Tatum, from The Complete Pablo Solo Masterpieces.
This was the title track of country music crooner Ferlin Husky's 1957 album.
Billy Eckstine's first greatest-hits compilation, Billy's Best! (1958) with Bobby Tucker Orchestra, arranged by Henry Mancini and Pete Rugolo.
In 1958, Morton Downey Jr. sang the song on national television, on a set that resembled a dark street with one street light.
It was covered by No Wave artist James White on his 1983 album Flaming Demonics.
Marianne Faithfull covered it in her Hal Willner-produced album Strange Weather in 1987, and later on 20th Century Blues (1996).
Monsieur Camembert featured it on their ARIA award-winning self-titled album, Monsieur Camembert, sung by Jacqi Stoddard.
Diana Krall covered the song on her 1996 album All for You: a Dedication to the Nat King Cole Trio and on the International Limited Edition version of her 2006 album From This Moment On, which was also released as a bonus track on iTunes.
This song was featured on a BBC Apprentice advertisement in 2010.
It was covered by the progressive rock group Café Jacques on their 1978 album International.
Leslie Cheung covered it in 1996 and included the cover in the Japanese edition of his album Red.
The song was sung live on the ABC show Dancing with the Stars in 2010 (Season 11, episode 4) by the show's band during an Argentine tango dance featuring Anna Demidova and Andrey Begunov.
Amy Winehouse covered the song during her 2011 Soul Festival show in Brazil.
Sylvia Brooks covered the song on her 2013 album Restless.
Haim Hefer wrote Hebrew lyrics titled "Ha-Peruta veha-Yareach" (הפרוטה והירח) in 1948 to a melody based in part on "Boulevard of Broken Dreams" and in part on "Veinte años."
Puddles Pity Party recorded a cover of the song in Doppler Studios, Atlanta GA on Sept 29th 2015.
Canadian pop crooner Matt Forbes released his contemporary version of the song as a single in May 2022.

References

External links
Boulevard of Broken Dreams at artgrok.org
"Boulevard of Broken Dreams" - Al Dubin Detailed Song List at Songwriters Hall of Fame
"Boulevard of Broken Dreams" - Harren Warren Detailed Song List at Songwriters Hall of Fame
"Ha-Peruta veha-Yareach" at zemereshet - Hebrew song to this melody

1933 songs
Songs with lyrics by Al Dubin
Songs with music by Harry Warren
Tony Bennett songs
The Muppets songs
Great Depression songs